The Simoni people were a Native American group in Texas.

Simoni is a surname, and may refer to:

 Alexandre Simoni (born 1979), Brazilian tennis player
 Dario Simoni (1901-1984), American set decorator
 Elisa Simoni (born 1973), Italian politician
 Ernest Simoni (born 1928), Albanian priest of the Roman Catholic Church
 Giampiero Simoni (born 1969), Italian racing driver
 Gilberto Simoni (born 1971), Italian professional road bicycle racer
 Giuseppe Simoni (born 1944), Italian biologist and scientist
 Gjon Simoni (born 1936), Albanian musicologist and composer
 Luigi Simoni (born 1939), Italian football manager
 Renato Simoni (1875-1952), Italian journalist
 Sabrina Simoni (born 1969), Italian conductor
 Simone Simoni (1532-1602), Italian philosopher and physician
 Ugo Simoni (born 1938), Italian former sports shooter
 Xavier Simoni (born 1984), French ice hockey player
 Zef Simoni, Albanian bishop

Italian-language surnames
Patronymic surnames
Surnames from given names